Britannia High is a British musical drama television series co-produced by Granada Television and Globe Productions for the ITV network. The series focused on the lives of a group of teenagers and their mentors at a fictional London theatre school. It aired on ITV and TV3 Ireland, premiering on 26 October 2008.

The show starred Sapphire Elia, Georgina Hagen, Mitch Hewer, Rana Roy, Matthew James Thomas and Marcquelle Ward, as well as Adam Garcia as the dance mentor, Lorraine Pilkington as the music mentor and Mark Benton as the school principal and acting mentor. In addition to the main cast, the series featured cameo performances from Girls Aloud, Boyzone, Matt Willis and Gemma Bissix. Also, Aston Merrygold, lead singer of boy band JLS, auditioned for the role before his success in the group - but only made it to the final 16. George Ure, who attended Mountview Academy, also auditioned before his success in the musical Wicked where he played Boq. Pixie Lott also auditioned, as did Ed Sheeran and Danielle Peazer. The show featured an original soundtrack which was created by a team of pop producers and writers in the UK, led by Take That member Gary Barlow.

Production
Britannia High was based on an idea by Strictly Come Dancing choreography judge Arlene Phillips and theatre impresario David Ian, who were both executive producers for the show. It was developed by producer Gareth Philips for ITV Productions in Manchester. Alongside Philips, the production team consisted of series producer and lead director Brian Grant, executive producers Kieran Roberts and Mark Wells, and Anna Land for Globe Productions. It was written by Jonathan Harvey, Damon Rochefort, Julie Jones, Kirstie Falkous, and John Regier.

In addition to Arlene Phillips managing the choreography, Gary Barlow was heavily involved in providing the score of Britannia High. Guy Chambers, Steve Mac, Andy Hill, Mark Owen, James Bourne and Eliot Kennedy also contributed to the musical component of the show.

Britannia High was commissioned by ITV from its in-house production division. After low ratings, ITV did not commission a second series.

Episode list
Britannia High began broadcasting in a primetime Sunday night slot starting on 26 October 2008. The first episode was made available on ITV Player as a "sneak peek" on 17 October.

Release

Weekly ratings

Episode 2 was delayed by 15 minutes due to overrunning ITV Sport coverage of the Brazilian Grand Prix.

Interactive elements
Britannia High featured a wide range of online content, including on itv.com, ITV Mobile, ITV Interactive and the social networking site, Bebo.

The Britannia High website was the virtual home of the performing arts school, and featured interactive elements such as blogs, photographs, e-newsletters and music from Universal Artists. Additionally, two characters, BB and Jez, hosted a podcast featuring songs from the series and also world songs. ITV's red button service, ITV Interactive, featured preview and catch-up videos, character profiles, photo galleries and dance tutorials.

Soundtrack

The Britannia High Soundtrack was released on 24 November 2008. It included 18 songs from the show.

Track listing
Cast - "Start Of Something"
Danny - "Missing Person"
Lauren - "Best Of Me"
Lauren and Claudine - "Watch This Space"
Claudine and Danny - "Growing Pains"
Lauren and Jezz - "What Good Is Love"
Lauren - "So High"
Jez - "Wake Up"
Lola and Stefan - "Body To Body"
BB - "The Things That We Don't Say"
Jez - "Proud"
BB and Jez - "Fight Song"
Claudine - "Do It All Over Again"
Lola, Lauren and Claudine - "Picking Up The Pieces"
BB - "Confessions"
Cast - "Without You"
Jez - "Weight Of The World"
Danny and Lauren - "Changing Man"

The CD also features a weblink which allows the owner to download a "Britannia High Megamix" (ft. "Start Of Something", "Wake Up", "Missing Person", "Best of Me" and "Watch This Space"), "Start of Something" video, "Start of Something" (behind the scenes) and a remix of "Watch This Space".

Additional broadcast

CITV
The hour-long episodes of Britannia High were reconfigured into two-part 30-minute episodes, and broadcast on ITV's children's strand CITV from 20 April 2009. In accordance with CITV's target audience, words such as "bitch" and "sex" have been edited out of dialogue and songs.

On Demand
All nine 45-minute episodes were made available to Virgin Media's customers through ITV Player, which is carried on Virgin's On Demand service.

References

External links
 

2000s British drama television series
2000s British music television series
2008 British television series debuts
2008 British television series endings
2000s British television miniseries
ITV television dramas
Television series about teenagers
Television series by ITV Studios
Television shows produced by Granada Television
English-language television shows